The Crau is the ancient confluence of the Durance and Rhône, and constitutes their vast flat alluvial fan.

Agriculture
The Crau is composed of two different parts:

The dry Crau is in the south, and has been used as pasture from Roman times. There are around 100,000 sheep , including the Merino sheep.

The wet Crau is in the north and includes the communes of Saint-Martin-de-Crau, Eyguières, Istres, Mouriès, and Arles. It produces the Crau hay, which benefits from an Appellation d’origine contrôlée

Flora and fauna
Thyme
Holm oak
Pin-tailed sandgrouse
Little bustard
Lesser kestrel

History
The Crau was described by Strabo as the Stony Plain (Book IV Chapter 1).

External links

 La Crau, on Arles website

River deltas of Europe
Landforms of Bouches-du-Rhône
Plains of France
Landforms of Provence-Alpes-Côte d'Azur